Rowdon is a surname. Notable people with the surname include:

George Rowdon (1914–1987), British cricketer
Wade Rowdon (born 1960), American baseball player

See also
Rowson